Hathaway High School (HHS) is a K-12 school in Hathaway, unincorporated Jeff Davis Parish, Louisiana. It is a part of Jefferson Davis Parish Public Schools. The current building is  large.

As of 2016, the school had 780 students.

History
It opened in 1920 in a wooden building on a site that had been acquired from George Hathaway and W. Claude Lamb; it was formed by a merger of the Crochet, Glen Roy, Grand Marais, Nubbin Ridge, and Raymond elementary schools. In 1938-1939 a new steel school building opened, and high school grades opened, with the first graduating class in 1941. A new cafeteria opened in 1945. The school received the twelfth grade in the 1948–1949 school year. A renovation occurred in 1953. In 1975 kindergarten grades opened as they became required under state law. Six more classrooms were installed in 1983. A fire on Sunday, November 26, 1989, destroyed much of the school building, so students temporarily had to attend classes in Lake Arthur while a replacement school building financed by an October 1989 bond was underway. The current building opened in Fall 1992.

Athletics
Hathaway High athletics competes in the LHSAA.

References

External links
 Hathaway High School
 

Schools in Jefferson Davis Parish, Louisiana
1920 establishments in Louisiana
Educational institutions established in 1920
Public K-12 schools in Louisiana